Sigbjørn (Danish, Faroese, Norwegian) or Sigbjörn (Icelandic, Swedish) is a Nordic male given name, meaning Victory-bear and dating back to the Viking Age. A female form exist as Sigurbirna (Victory-bearess).

Historic variants 
Sigbiorn (♂ male) – Old Swedish
Sigbiǫrn (♂ male) – Old Norse
Sigbjörn (♂ male) – Icelandic, Swedish
Sigbjørn (♂ male) – Danish, Faroese, Norwegian	
Sigbjǫrn (♂ male) – Old Norse
Sighbiorn (♂ male) – Old Danish, Old Swedish
Sigurbirna (♀ female) – Icelandic
Sigurbjarni (♂ male) – Icelandic
Sigurbjörn (♂ male) – Icelandic
Sigurbjørn (♂ male) – Faroese, Norwegian

Notable people named Sigbjørn 
Notable people with the given name include:

 Sigbjørn Apeland (born 1966), Norwegian musician and scientist
 Sigbjørn Eriksen (1936–2021), Norwegian politician
 Sigbjørn Gjelsvik (born 1974), Norwegian politician
 Sigbjørn Hølmebakk (1922–1981), Norwegian author
 Sigbjørn Johnsen (born 1950), Norwegian politician
 Sigbjørn Larsen (born 1936), Norwegian politician
 Sigbjørn Molvik (born 1950), Norwegian politician
 Sigbjørn Mustad (1897–1970), Norwegian lawyer and politician 
 Sigbjørn Obstfelder (1866–1900), Norwegian writer and poet
 Sigbjørn Bernhoft Osa (1910–1990), Norwegian fiddler and traditional folk musician
 Sigbjørn Ravnåsen (1941–2016), Norwegian researcher, principal and politician

References 

Scandinavian masculine given names